Janegraya is a genus of fossil with controversial interpretation from the Middle Ordovician (Darriwilian, 460 million years old) Douglas Lake Member of the Lenoir Limestone from Douglas Dam Tennessee. The generic name honors Jane Gray, and the epithet means "prophetess".

[[File:Janegraya sibylla perianth.tif|thumb|left|Periant around spore masses of 'Janegraya sibylla]]

DescriptionJanegraya is considered as a minute fossil balloonwort (Sphaerocarpaceae) by Gregory Retallack, and similar  to living Sphaerocarpos. Its spores are permanent tetrads closed within a thin perine, widely known among Ordovician dispersed spores as Tetrahedraletes''.

Biological affinities
The interpretation of this fossil as an Ordovician example of Sphaerocarpaceae has been questioned in some quarters  but accepted in others.

References

Fossils of Tennessee
Fossil record of plants
Ordovician plants
Sphaerocarpales
Prehistoric plant genera
Liverwort genera